The 10.5 cm SK L/40 (SK - Schnelladekanone (quick-loading cannon) L - Länge (with a 40-caliber long barrel) was a German naval gun used in World War I and World War II.

Description
It used a horizontal sliding-block breech design.

Naval use
 Bremen-class
 Dresden-class
 Gazelle-class
 Iltis-class
 Königsberg-class
 SMS Cap Trafalgar

Surviving examples

From :
 Nr. 369L is on display at the Union Buildings in Pretoria, South Africa
 A second is on display at Fort Jesus, Mombasa, Kenya
 A third is located on a traffic island in Jinja, Uganda
From :
 A gun is on display at Hyde Park, Sydney, Australia
 A third is on display at the Australian War Memorial in Canberra
From the Hilfskreuzer (auxiliary cruiser) 
 A gun is on display at Memorial Park, Cambridge, NY, United States

See also
 List of naval guns
 British BL 4 inch naval gun Mk VIII - firing slightly lighter shell

Notes 
http://www.navweaps.com/Weapons/WNGER_41-40_skc00.php

Sources

External links

 SK L/40 at Navweaps.com

105 mm artillery
Naval guns of Germany